Iraklis Gerolakkou  is a Cypriot football team currently playing in the .
The team was established in Gerolakkos, Nicosia in 1948. The current manager is Costas Papageorgiou.

The club has played two season in the Cypriot Second Division.

League participations
Cypriot Second Division: 2005–2007
Cypriot Third Division: 2007–2008, 2009–2010
Cypriot Fourth Division: 2008–2009, 2010–

Honours
 Cypriot Third Division
   Winners (2): 1973–74, 1979–80

 STOK Elite Division:
   Winners (1): 2018–19 (shared record)

References

External links
 Weltfussball 
 Soccerway
 

Football clubs in Cyprus
Association football clubs established in 1948
1948 establishments in Cyprus